Alpha Street productions and later Alpha Sports Productions (ASP) were an Australian kit car and racing car manufacturer. It has made sports cars and open wheeler cars. Originally building cars based on the Lotus Seven but have evolved to construct their own distinctive designs.

History 
Alpha street productions was founded by Ray Lewis and Rory Thompson in the early sixties after the two had met through a common interest in sportscars. Ray, the part owner of Lewis Brothers Buses amongst other businesses provided the premises for their venture at his family home of Alpha house on Alpha Street Kensington Park in Adelaide. Rory however provided the technical knowledge after earning qualifications in mechanical engineering from the South Australian Institute of Technology.

Working initially on a Lotus 7 for Derek Jolly Rory decided certain deficiencies of the Lotus design could be overcome with the design of a new chassis. This first attempt at an entire car was named the Bacchus after the Greek god of wine. The first of the chassis was sold bare but further cars were built with a variety of drivetrains fitted.

After Ray returned from an overseas trip work began on what was now the Mk4 Bacchus Clubman. This car was renamed twice though, first from Bacchus to Shrike and then from Shrike to ASP, the company's initials. This first road car was known as the ASP 320A and was the only one of its type built. This car was sold to Paul Hannon who worked for the Savings Bank of South Australia and had spent time at the ASP premises when he was younger. The connection to the bank led the car to being used in an advertising campaign, driving sales of what was now the B spec of the new ASP Clubman.

Starting with the ASP 320B ASP started to build a car specifically for racing with four 320B's produced for this purpose, although most have found their way onto road registration since. From these 320B Clubmans came a short wheelbase version renamed the 340A. this was the beginning of a series of racing Clubmans. This first car known also as the Potts lightweight was owned by Doug Potts was powered by a Galant motor and was later converted to a road car by ASP employee Colin Reilly.

At about this time, 1971, ASP branched out into open wheeler formula cars with Formula 2 and 3 cars, the ASP 330. Four of these cars were built in period, three racing in Formula 3 and one in Formula 2. After this ASP returned exclusively to Clubman-style sports cars.

In 1972 two 340B cars were produced of a completely new design. One of these cars, Chassis 23 was built for Jim Doig who was still racing the car in 2021 and despite a large crash at The Bend in South Australia is intending to fix the car and have it back on track in 2022 for the cars 50th year. This design was followed closely by the 340C built from 1972 to 73. Six of these cars were built and all but one seem to have survived the intervening years.

These cars followed the Clubman Formula of the day: single camshaft engine of no more than 1.3 litres capacity, front engine two seat racing cars. All were powered by either the Toyota Corolla 3K or Datsun A12 engine and ran a differential from a Morris. These highly effective sports cars were affordable and quick, able to embarrass much more powerful sports cars and smaller formula type cars regularly.

By 1974 it had become clear that the company's finances were not as they should be, and a series of issues caused Ray to decide to wind the company up with Ray and Rory going their separate ways. However, after building some new road going ASP Clubmans in his spare time Rory decided to start a new business Alpha Sports Productions to build new models of the ASP 320. These were built by their owners under the supervision of Rory at his premises in Salisbury and not only resulted in a car, but the learning of all the skills to build the car being acquired by the owner. The final cars were known as the ASP 320G and were generally powered by 4AGE engines from a Toyota with some later owners moving to Mazda engines.

Ray Lewis died in November 2005. His previous years had been affected by an adverse reaction to prescription medication changing his personality. He was however still involved with the design of ASP cars, helping to design the Targa-style rollbar seen on the later cars. Rory Thompson followed him in 2020 bringing production of ASP sportscars to an end at least with one of the original founders at the helm.

Models

Bacchus 
The Bacchus represented the first original car from the Alpha Street factory. Named after the Greek god of wine these Lotus 7 inspired Clubman cars were powered by a variety of engines with a total of six cars completed under this name.

ASP 320 
The ASP 320 was born out of the previous Bacchus series of cars. Initially referred to as the Bacchus Mk 4 the car was renamed twice, once as the Shrike and then the ASP 320A. 320s continued to be made right up until the end of the company making it all the way to a G spec car with modern running gear in the traditional ASP 320 bodywork.

ASP 330 
The ASP 330 represented a change in ASP by branching out into open wheeler formula cars. Four cars were built in period, three Formula 3's and one Formula 2.

ASP 340

340A 
The 340A, otherwise known as the Potts lightweight, was based on a 320B race chassis but shortened and lightened. campaigned by Doug Potts in period this car was later converted to road spec by ASP employee Colin Reilly.

340B 

The new for 1972 340B was a new dedicated race chassis very different from its predecessors from the Alpha Street factory. Two cars of this type were produced original owners and chassis numbers are as follows.

 #23 J Doig: Toyota Celica 1600 
 #24 D Wallace: Ford 1500

Chassis #23 still owned and driven by Jim Doig in particular is a well known car in its native South Australia and beyond having been in almost constant use since new with well over 1000 races to date. Chassis #24 however has since been converted to road use.

340C 

The 340C further developed the ideas introduced in the 340B in a dedicated lightweight racing chassis. In all six cars were built all to Clubman sports 1300 regulations with 1300cc engines. the original owners, car chassis numbers and engines are as follows

 #29 Alby Middleton: Datsun A12 
 #30 David Mc Bean: Toyota 3K 
 #31 David Walsh: Toyota 3K 
 #32 Ken Durward: Datsun A12 
 #33 John Blanden: Datsun A12 
 #34 Jim Bidstrup: Toyota 3K

These cars were built using 19x1.2 square steel tube nickel bronze welded to create a very light dedicated racing chassis with a short wheelbase. Front suspension was by unequal length non-parallel wishbones with externally mounted coilover shock absorbers. The rear suspension used a Morris live axle located by an A frame at the bottom which provided both fore-and-aft and lateral location while two short arms were used at the top. More than one car was later updated in period to longer wheelbase and four long arms and a Panhard rod for rear axle location.

ASP 350 
The ASP 350 was an attempt at building a new design of sports car by Rory Thompson based on readily available running gear. this car featured Holden commodore engine and drivetrain.

See also

 List of automobile manufacturers
 List of car brands

References

External links
 Alpha Sports Productions

Car manufacturers of Australia
Kit car manufacturers
Lotus Seven replicas
Sports car manufacturers
Australian brands